Kent Jones (born January 8, 1967) is an American professional golfer.

Jones was born in Portales, New Mexico. He graduated from the University of New Mexico with a bachelor's (1990) and master's (1991) degree in business administration. He turned professional in 1992.

Jones has played on the Canadian Tour (1993–94), the Hooters Tour (1995), the Nationwide Tour (1996–97, 2000, 2010, 2012–13), and the PGA Tour (1998–99, 2001–09). He has two wins on the Web.com Tour, both coming in 2000.

Jones career best placed finish on the PGA Tour is a T6 at the 2006 84 Lumber Classic. His career earnings are over $5.3 million.

Professional wins (2)

Buy.com Tour wins (2)

Results in major championships

CUT = missed the half-way cut
"T" = tied
Note: Jones only played in the U.S. Open.

Results in The Players Championship

CUT = missed the halfway cut
"T" indicates a tie for a place

Results in senior major championships

"T" indicates a tie for a place
CUT = missed the halfway cut
NT = No tournament due to COVID-19 pandemic

See also
1997 PGA Tour Qualifying School graduates
1998 PGA Tour Qualifying School graduates
2000 Buy.com Tour graduates
2001 PGA Tour Qualifying School graduates
2007 PGA Tour Qualifying School graduates
2008 PGA Tour Qualifying School graduates
2010 PGA Tour Qualifying School graduates

References

External links

American male golfers
New Mexico Lobos men's golfers
PGA Tour golfers
PGA Tour Champions golfers
Korn Ferry Tour graduates
People from Portales, New Mexico
Golfers from Albuquerque, New Mexico
1967 births
Living people